Jérôme Hantaï (born 1961) is a viola da gamba player and fortepianist.

Biography 
Son of the painters Simon Hantaï and Zsuzsa Hantaï, Jérôme Hantaï grew up outside Paris. He was initially self-taught and played the recorder, harpsichord, fortepiano, and viola da gamba. He went on to study gamba with Wieland Kuijken at the Royal Conservatory of Brussels, where he received a Premier Prix in 1984.

As a gamba and violone player, he has performed with numerous pioneers of the early music movement, including Sigiswald and Wieland Kuijken, René Jacobs, and Jean-Claude Malgoire. In France, he participated in the formation some of the first early music ensembles, such as the Orchestre Baroque d’Île-de-France and the Ensemble Orlando Gibbons. He is best known as a member of the Trio Hantaï, where he plays alongside his brothers Marc (traverso) and Pierre (harpsichord). In 2018, he founded the Duo Gordis-Hantaï with the harpsichordist Lillian Gordis.

He additionally records and tours as a fortepianist and gamba player and founded and directs the viol consort, Spes Nostra (formerly the Ensemble Jérôme Hantaï) and the Trio Almaviva. He has recorded music of Marin Marais, W.A. Mozart, and Joseph Haydn for Naïve, Virgin Veritas, Musicales Actes-Sud, and most recently, Mirare and received numerous prizes, including two Diapasons d’Or and a Choc du Monde de la musique.

Discography

Solo 

 2019: Haydn/Mozart Sonates. Mirare
 2015: Consort Music au temps de Shakespeare : William Byrd et ses contemporains / Spes Nostra. Musicales Actes-Sud
 2005: Joseph Haydn: Sonates pour pianoforte. Ambroisie
 2005: Music for Bass Viols. Virgin Veritas
 2004: John Jenkins: Fantazia / Ensemble Jérôme Hantaï. Ambronay Éditions / Naïve
 2001: Marais: Pièces à 2 et à 3 violes / Jérôme Hantaï, Kaori Uemura, Alix Verzier, Pierre Hantaï. Virgin Veritas
 2001: Marais: Pièces de viole, vol. 2. Virgin Veritas
 1999: Trios pour pianoforte, violon et violoncelle, no. 36, 37 et 40 / Jérôme Hantaï, Philippe Couvert, Alix Verzier. Astrée Naïve
 1999: Pièces pour deux basses de viole / Jérôme Hantaï, Kaori Uemura. Virgin Veritas
 1997: Marais: Pièces de viole. Virgin Veritas

Other 

 2005: Cecilia Bartoli: Opera Probita. Decca
 2004: François Couperin : La Sultanne, Préludes & Concerts royaux / Alfredo Bernardini, François Fernandez, Emmanuel Balssa, Elisabeth Joyé. Alpha
 2001: Beethoven: Irish and Scottish Songs / Sophie Daneman, Paul Agnew, Peter Harvey. Astrée Naïve
 2000: Deutsche Kantaten: Tunder, Kuhnau, Bruhns, Graupner / Collegium Vocale Gent, dir. Philippe Herreweghe. Harmonia Mundi France
 1999: JS Bach, Sonates pour flûte / Trio Hantaï and Ageet Zweistra. Virgin Veritas
 1992: Tous les matins du monde [soundtrack]. Alia Vox
 1991: Christmas Concerto, Sonatas after Concerti Grossi op. VI / Le Concert Français. Opus 111
 1990: Delalande: Symphonies pour le Souper du Roy / Ensemble La Simphonie du Marais, Hugo Reyne. Harmonia Mundi

External links 

 "Haydn-Mozart par Jérôme Hantaï", Le Disque classique du jour, France Musique. 11 June 2019. https://www.francemusique.fr/emissions/le-disque-classique-du-jour/haydn-mozart-sonates-jerome-hantai-mirare-72837
 "Che bella voce", Classic Club, France Musique. Interview with Jérôme Hantaï, 19 December 2016. https://www.francemusique.fr/emissions/classic-club/che-bella-voce-30512

References 

1961 births
Living people
Viol players
Fortepianists
French musicians